= Jay Sweet (musician) =

American jazz bassist, educator, and author

Jay Sweet (born 26 April 1976) is an American jazz bassist, educator, and author. He has authored several books. As a performer, Sweet has appeared with Norman Simmons, Ted Curson, and Bruce Williams, and his debut album The Chase (2000) was praised in DownBeat. He performs with the Atmospheric Trio, whose 2025 album Following Polaris received positive reviews in The Jazz Word and All About Jazz. He founded Sweet Music Academy in Howell, New Jersey, in 2004, which provides private instruction in a variety of instruments and music styles.

== Music career ==
Sweet studied jazz performance and composition at Berklee College of Music under Whit Browne and John Lockwood.

His debut album The Chase (2000) was noted by DownBeat for its “swinging originals.”

After returning to New Jersey, he performed extensively in the New York–Tri-State jazz scene, appearing with Norman Simmons, Ted Curson, and Bruce Williams.

In 2025 he co-founded Atmospheric Trio, whose debut album Following Polaris was praised by All About Jazz for its “intriguing textures and deep interplay” and described by The Jazz Word as “a hauntingly beautiful fusion of Americana and modern jazz.”

== Author ==
In 2021 Sweet published A History of American Music: 1750–1950 – An Origin Story with Kendall Hunt Publishing Company.

In 2025 Kendall Hunt published Sweet’s textbook Global Pop Music: The Music of a Connected World.

In 2024 Kendall Hunt released Sweet’s textbook The Music of 1964: The 50 Most Impactful Albums.

In 2025 Kendall Hunt published Sweet’s textbook From Sound to Sense: Modern Explanation of Music Appreciation, History, and Evaluation.

In 2025 Equinox Publishing released Sweet’s biography Ray Brown: His Life and Music, which has been reviewed internationally. UK Jazz News described it as “a deeply researched and valuable contribution to jazz history”, PopMatters called it “a balanced, authoritative account”, and Jersey Jazz published an extended excerpt and review by Joe Lang.

== Education and teaching ==
In 2004 Sweet founded Sweet Music Academy in Howell Township, New Jersey, which has taught over 4,000 students.

He is a Lecturer of Jazz Studies at Monmouth University, where he teaches bass performance, jazz history, American music history, and music appreciation.

He has also taught at Middlesex College and Rutgers University.

== Podcasts ==
Sweet produces two podcasts:

- The Jazz Real Book — interviews with jazz artists and explorations of jazz history.
- 30 Albums for 30 Years: 1964–1994 — a year-by-year exploration of landmark recordings.

== Selected discography ==
- The Chase (2000) — reviewed in DownBeat.
- Following Polaris (with Atmospheric Trio, 2025) — praised in The Jazz Word and All About Jazz.
